An academic quarter refers to the division of an academic year into four parts.

Historical context 
The modern academic quarter calendar can be traced to the historic English law court / legal training pupillage four term system:  
 Hilary: January–March
 Easter: April–May
 Trinity: June–July
 Michaelmas: October–December
This quarter system was adopted by the oldest universities in the English-speaking world (Oxford, founded circa 1096, and Cambridge, founded circa 1209).

Over time, Cambridge dropped Trinity Term and renamed Hilary Term to Lent Term, and Oxford also dropped the original Trinity Term and renamed Easter Term as Trinity Term, thus establishing the three-term academic "quarter" year widely found in countries with a lineage to England or the United Kingdom.

Charterhouse, an English independent school, still refers to its three academic terms as "quarters".

United States

Background and trends 
In the United States, quarters typically comprise 10 weeks of class instruction, although they have historically ranged from eight to 13 weeks.  Academic quarters first came into existence as such when William Rainey Harper organized the University of Chicago on behalf of John D. Rockefeller in 1891.  Harper decided to keep the school in session year-round and divide it into four terms instead of the then-traditional two.

Of the four traditional academic calendars (semester, quarter, trimester, and 4-1-4), the semester calendar is used the most widely, at over 60% of U.S. higher learning institutions, with fewer than 20% using the quarter system.  This number has stayed fairly constant since 1930, when 75% of U.S. institutions surveyed indicated they used a semester plan, with 22% on the quarter system.

During the 1960s, a number of U.S. state university systems made a switch from a semester to quarter system, typically in an attempt to accommodate the large number of post-war "baby boom" students who had reached college age (sometimes called the "Tidal Wave I enrollment boom"). A prominent example of this trend was the University of California system.  Since then, UC Berkeley switched back to semesters in 1983, the new UC Merced branch opened with the semester system, and some UC professional schools have switched back to semesters at various points.  In 2020, UC San Diego considered a switch to the semester system as well. At various points since the 1960s, committees have been established and official discussions have taken place within the UC system to discuss a systemwide switch back to the semester system.

In recent years, a number of higher education institutions have considered or approved a switch to a semester system. The University System of Ohio, which includes Ohio State University, Ohio University, and the University of Cincinnati, converted to the semester system in 2012 to better align with other public and private institutions in the state, among other reasons. Individual schools have also switched, like Georgia Tech in 1999.  Rochester Institute of Technology converted to semesters in Fall 2013, although the decision was highly controversial, overriding a student vote to remain with quarters. Other institutions and systems that have switched include California State University, Los Angeles, Auburn University, the University of Minnesota system, the Utah State system, and Northeastern University. Southern Oregon University was required to study a switch to the semester system as part of state legislation on a possible merger with the University of Oregon.

Arguments
Concerns over the quarter system include faculty dislike of the brevity of the term, the loss of faculty research and collaboration time, the end of the spring quarter overrunning the start date of many established summer internships which also leads to shorter internship periods, difficulties in recovering from illness-linked absence, and the heavy administrative workload.

A quarter system calendar also may put schools at a disadvantage in competing for prospective students, who wish to keep in-step with friends, and offer more opportunities for students to "disconnect from school."

The quarter system can also make more difficult the process of transferring credits for past coursework completed in semester institutions, including from other universities or community colleges in the same state.

Quarter systems do allow students to enroll in a richer variety of courses and school-coordinated internships and may encourage students to take on double majors, minors, concentrations, and the like.
A quarter system can maximize the use of college facilities in a time of enrollment growth, as it allows for four regular periods of academic instruction.  Also, quarters allow for faculty to engage in terms with a relatively light course load of teaching and greater opportunities for short sabbaticals.

See also
 Academic term
 Legal year

References

Education policy